The Bungalow Historic District in Garden City, Kansas is a historic district which was listed on the National Register of Historic Places in 2000.

It includes five residential buildings and five garages, out of which six are contributing buildings, at 1001, 1005, 1007, 1009, and 1011 N. Fourth St.

References

External links

Historic districts on the National Register of Historic Places in Kansas
Mission Revival architecture in Kansas
Buildings and structures completed in 1930
Finney County, Kansas